Toby Myles (born July 23, 1975) is a former American football tackle. He played for the New York Giants in 1999 and for the Cleveland Browns and Oakland Raiders in 2001.

References

1975 births
Living people
American football offensive tackles
Mississippi State Bulldogs football players
Jackson State Tigers football players
New York Giants players
Cleveland Browns players
Oakland Raiders players